Utopia Independent School District is a public school district based in the community of Utopia, Texas, US.

Located in Uvalde County, the district extends into portions of Bandera, Real, and Medina counties.

Utopia ISD has one school - Utopia High School - that serves students in grades pre-kindergarten through twelve.

In 2009, the school district was rated "recognized" by the Texas Education Agency.

References

External links
 

School districts in Uvalde County, Texas
School districts in Medina County, Texas
School districts in Bandera County, Texas
School districts in Real County, Texas